Mavrin is a Russian masculine surname, its feminine counterpart is Mavrina. It may refer to
Sergey Mavrin (born 1963), Russian heavy metal musician
Yulia Mavrina (born 1984), Russian theater, film and television actress 

Russian-language surnames